Big Brother 2012 is the eight season of the Finnish reality television series Big Brother that premiered on August 28, 2012, on Sub.

Elina Viitanen returned to host the show, but Susanna Laine did not continue. Viitanen left Big Brother Extra to host the Big Brother Talk Show alone, and new host of Big Brother Extra is singer Cristal Snow.

Housemates

Nominations table 
The first housemate in each box was nominated for two points, and the second housemate was nominated for one point.

Notes
 : Any nominations cast did not count. Nominations for Week 1 were randomly decided by Big Brother. The Big Brother Mole, Milla, left the House on Day 5.
 : Male housemates were immune from nominations during their first and second week in the house due to the uneven ratio between males and females.
 : Rather than being evicted, Sarah, Johanna and Lida were fake evicted. They will live in another area of the House in secret for a few days. They were immune from nominations for two weeks.
 : Eviction voting was done in public by housemates.
 : The blue team (Sarah, Jonna A, Tommi, Anne, Markus, Teija and Irina) won the eviction competition and only they could nominate that week.
 : The blue team (Tomi, Markus, Johanna, Iida, Jonna I, Tommi, Sarah and Anne) won the eviction competition and only they could nominate that week.
 : Irina received three extra nomination points as a penalty.
 : Irina was ejected from the house due to medical issues.
 : Tomi, Anne, Iida and Johanna used all three extra points this time and Jonna I used one extra point.
 : The new housemates were able to decide immunity to one female housemate, choosing Iida, meaning she along with the new housemates were immune. Tea used three of her extra nomination points. Teija, Markus and both Jonnas used one point.
 : Petteri used three extra points. Jarno used two extra points and Teija used one extra point.
 : There were no nominations this week. There were "male" and "female" buttons in the house. The buttons were activated for a short period of time, and the buttons pressed first during activation time decided if the males or the females faced eviction that week. Jonna A managed to press the "male" button first so all males are up for eviction.
 : Petteri ejected due breaking rules.
 : Joni was able to give nomination points after his eviction.

Nomination Totals Received

Nominations: Results

External links
 Official Website 

2012 Finnish television seasons
08